Lazdeika the Crab is a rainbow crab from Lithuania. The crab was used by Delfi.lt web portal as an oracle to predict the outcomes of each of the Lithuania national basketball team matches in the EuroBasket 2011. The crab has also predicted the outcomes of Lithuania in 2012 FIBA World Olympic Qualifying Tournament and at the 2012 Summer Olympics.

Methodology 
During divinations, Lazdeika was presented with two coconut shells, each marked with one of the flags of the competing countries. The coconut Lazdeika chose to shelter in first was considered to be his prediction as to the winner of the game.

Predictions

EuroBasket 2011

2012 FIBA World Olympic Qualifying Tournament

2012 Olympic Basketball Tournament

References

External links 
 Information (Lithuanian)

Oracular animals
FIBA EuroBasket 2011
Individual arthropods
Basketball in Lithuania